Jake Kelly may refer to:

 Jake Kelly (footballer, born 1990), footballer in the League of Ireland
 Jake Kelly (Australian footballer) (born 1995), Australian rules football player
 Jake Kelly (cyclist) (born 1995), British and Isle of Man road and track cyclist